The Whistle Blower is a 1986 British spy thriller film directed by Simon Langton and starring Michael Caine, James Fox, Nigel Havers, Felicity Dean, John Gielgud, Kenneth Colley, Gordon Jackson,  David Langton, and Barry Foster. It is based on the 1984 novel of the same name by John Hale.

Plot

Frank (Caine) is a retired British naval officer, now runs a small business. His bright but naive and idealistic son, Bob (Nigel Havers), works as a linguist at GCHQ, the top secret British intelligence listening station, translating intercepted conversations from behind the Iron Curtain.

The film opens with footage of the Remembrance Day parade in Whitehall in the present (c. 1985), attended by the Queen Elizabeth II, and shows Frank in the crowd, wearing medals, then moves to Bob's flat some months earlier, when Bob tells his father of an upheaval at GCHQ, where there is evidence of a Soviet mole, and security is encouraging staff to report on each other, as the leak must be found before their American counterparts find out about it. He tells him that he's planning to leave and marry Cynthia Goodburn (Felicity Dean) who has a young daughter. Frank isn't pleased. The scene cuts to a room in British Intelligence, where Bruce (Gordon Jackson) and another are recording their conversation. Frank is warned by an old Navy chum Greig (Barry Foster), who's now with MI6, that his business could be ruined by any indiscretion on his son's part.

At their next meeting, which is being secretly monitored, Bob tells his father he is about to reveal what he knows about illegal operations conducted by his department, and after some soul-searching, contacts  investigative reporter Bill Pickett (Kenneth Colley). Shortly afterward, Frank is informed that Bob has died in a rooftop fall, perhaps suicide, but a verdict of accidental death is recorded.
Back at Bob's flat, Frank is confronted by Pickett, but refuses to comment.
In the pocket of his son's jacket is a couple of newspaper clippings — one tells how Cynthia's husband, who ostensibly committed suicide, was a colleague of the convicted spy Dodgson. The other is about the death of Kedge, Dodgson's friend, who fell under a train.

Frank has a meeting with Pickett, who is subsequently killed in an elaborately staged traffic accident. Pickett was on his way to East Grinstead, having organised a rendezvous with Bob's contact and Frank.
At Bob's funeral, Frank is approached by Bob's friend and fellow British intelligence linguist Mark. 
Frank learns from Mark that it was his Navy friend Greig who quizzed him about Bob's loyalty.
Frank gets Greig drunk and extracts from him the confession that he was at Bob's flat the night of his death, but did not kill him — his job was only to leave the door open for the strongarm boys. He also reveals the name of the mole as Sir Adrian Chapple.

Leaving Greig in his drunken stupor, Frank is picked up by British Intelligence and driven to a country house, where he is confronted by Secretary to the Cabinet (David Langton) and Lord (James Fox). They explain to him that his son was out of control, and was killed to protect a plan to mislead the Americans as to the extent of the depth of Russian intelligence's operatives inside British operations, in the hope that they could continue to gain intelligence from the CIA. They have presently left Chapple in place, until they can assess the extent of the damage caused. They advise Frank that should he go public with any of this information, he or Cynthia and her daughter would be the next to suffer.

The film returns to the present, and the Remembrance Day parade. Frank fronts up to Chapple's Whitehall residence, and being mistaken for a collector for charity, is admitted inside. After being confronted with the facts, Chapple admits to spying for Russia. Frank orders him to write a full confession, which he does, but as Frank is reading it, Chapple produces a gun and demands its return. Frank grabs the gun, which goes off, killing Chapple. Leaving his signed confession,  seemingly a suicide note, Frank returns to the parade, joining the marchers.

Cast 
Michael Caine - Frank Jones
James Fox - Lord
Nigel Havers - Robert Jones, only referred to as "Bob"
John Gielgud - Sir Adrian Chapple, permanent secretary, Ministry of Defence
Felicity Dean - Cynthia Goodburn
Barry Foster - Charles Greig
Gordon Jackson - Bruce
Kenneth Colley - Bill Pickett
David Langton - Secretary to the Cabinet
Dinah Stabb - Rose
James Simmons - Mark, Robert's friend and fellow linguist
Katherine Reeve - Tiffany Goodburn, Cynthia's daughter
Bill Wallis - Ramsay Charles Dodgson, convicted spy
Trevor Cooper - Inspector Bourne
Peter Miles - Stephen Kedge, friend of spy Dodgson
David Shaughnessy - Medical officer
Patrick Holt - Irate driver

Production
The film was largely shot on location in Cheltenham, Gloucestershire, home of GCHQ, which forms the premise of the film. Cheltenham Racecourse, Cheltenham Spa station, Cheltenham Crematorium and the Promenade feature in the film. The London 'tube' murder scene was actually filmed on British Rail's Waterloo & City Line (which at the time did not run on Saturday afternoons or Sundays so was an accessible location for filming).

Response
Though it was given a limited release, the film opened to positive reviews. It has an approval rating of 89% on Rotten Tomatoes from 9 reviews.

Home media
The film was released in Australia on DVD (PAL) by Flashback Entertainment.

References

External links 
 

1986 films
1980s spy thriller films
British spy thriller films
Cold War spy films
Films set in London
Films based on British novels
Films based on thriller novels
Films about whistleblowing
Films scored by John Scott (composer)
Films directed by Simon Langton
1980s English-language films
1980s British films